Orazio Porta (born 1540) was an Italian painter active in the mannerist period. He was active from at least 1568 to 1580s.

Biography
He was a native of Monte San Savino, and is described as painting in a manner highly influenced or tutored by Giorgio Vasari. He has a number of altarpieces in the church of Santa Maria delle Vertighe in Monte Savino.

References

1540 births
16th-century Italian painters
Italian male painters
Painters from Tuscany
Italian Renaissance painters
Year of death unknown
People from Monte San Savino